Pocockia may refer to:
 Pocockia (millipede), a genus of millipedes in the family Metopidiotrichidae
 Pocockia, a genus of flowering plants in the family Fabaceae, synonym of Trigonella
 Pocockia, a genus of protists in the family Peridiniaceae, synonym of Ovoidinium